"Here I Go" is a song recorded by Belgian/Dutch Eurodance band 2 Unlimited. It is co-written by band members Ray Slijngaard and Anita Dels, and was released in March 1995 as the third single from their third album, Real Things (1994). In the US, the song was released as a double a-side single with 2 Unlimited's next European single, "Nothing Like the Rain". It was a top 10 hit in at least five countries; Belgium, Finland, Lithuania, the Netherlands and Spain.

Critical reception
Larry Flick from Billboard wrote, "One of the first act's to merge hi-NRG bounce with rave aggression may finally have the single that sends 'em all the way to the top of the pops. Male rapping and female vamping collide and happily coexist inside a storm of syncopated beats and blippy synth passages." Gil Robertson IV from Cash Box said, "Rap/hip-hop meets techno-dance on this single, which should do well on both rap and dance formats. The music here is thumping, pumping, and more, which should certainly get everyone partying on the dance floor." Caroline Sullivan from The Guardian complimented "a slightly pensive lyric" on the "percussive" track. A reviewer from Music Week felt that it "stays in familiar Euro techno territory", adding that "a mix from Alex Party should help it follow the previous 11 into the Top 20." In an retrospective review, Pop Rescue described "Here I Go" as "a belter of a track". James Hamilton from the RM Dance Update declared it as "unexpectedly terrific".

Chart performance
"Here I Go" scored chart success in many European countries, reaching the top 10 in Belgium (Flanders), Finland, Lithuania, the Netherlands (number four) and Spain. Additionally, it made it to the top 20 in Austria, Denmark and Sweden, and the top 30 in France, Germany, Scotland and the United Kingdom, as well as the Eurochart Hot 100, where it peaked at number 29 in April 1995. In the UK, "Here I Go" was the least successful single release by the band to date, reaching number 22 in its first week on the UK Singles Chart, on March 19, 1995. On the UK Dance Chart, it went to number 23. Outside Europe, the song charted in Australia and Canada, where it peaked at number 80 and 22.

Music video
The accompanying music video for "Here I Go" was far more arty and modern than previous videos, being shot in black and white with 2 Unlimited performing in a parking house and featuring performance artists on stilts. It was directed by director Nigel Simpkiss and was released in the UK in March 1995. Simpkiss also directed the music videos for "Let the Beat Control Your Body" and "The Real Thing". "Here I Go" was later published on 2 Unlimited's official YouTube channel in July 2014, and as of November 2022, the video had generated more than 1,4 million views.

Track listings

 European and Australian CD maxi
 "Here I Go" (Radio Edit) (3:16)
 "Here I Go" (X-Out Edit) (3:30)
 "Here I Go" (Dub Down Below) (7:26)
 "Here I Go" (X-Out In Dub) (5:29)
 "Here I Go" (Alex Party Remix) (4:40)

 UK CD single
 "Here I Go" (Radio Edit)
 "Here I Go" (Alex Party Remix)
 "Here I Go" (X-Out In Club)
 "Here I Go" (Dub Down Below)

 Italian CD single
 "Here I Go" (X-Out Edit) (3:20)
 "Here I Go" (Dub Down Below) (3:33)
 "Here I Go" (Album Version) (7:29)
 "Here I Go" (X-Out In Club) (5:33)
 "Here I Go" (Alex Party Remix) (4:45)

 US CD single
 "Here I Go" (Radio Edit) (3:16)
 "Here I Go" (Album Version) (5:13)
 "Here I Go" (X-Out Edit) (3:30)

 7" single
 "Here I Go" (Radio Edit) (3:16)
 "Here I Go" (X-Out Edit) (3:30)

 Belgian 12" maxi
 "Here I Go" (X-Out Edit) (3:30)
 "Here I Go" (Dub Down Below) (7:26)
 "Here I Go" (Album Version) (5:12)
 "Here I Go" (X-Out In Club) (5:29)
 "Here I Go" (Alex Party Remix) (4:40)

 UK 12" maxi
 "Here I Go" (X-Out In Club) (5:29)
 "Here I Go" (Album Version) (5:12)
 "Here I Go" (Alex Party Remix) (4:40)
 "Here I Go" (Dub Down Below) (7:26)

 German and Italian 12" maxi
 "Here I Go" (X-Out Edit) (3:30)
 "Here I Go" (Dub Down Below) (7:26)
 "Here I Go" (Album Version) (5:12)
 "Here I Go" (X-Out In Club) (5:29)
 "Here I Go" (Alex Party Remix) (4:40)

 French 12" maxi
 "Here I Go" (X-Out In Club) (5:29)
 "Here I Go" (Album Version) (5:12)
 "Here I Go" (Alex Party Remix) (4:40)
 "Here I Go" (X-Out Edit) (3:30)

 Spanish 12" maxi
 "Here I Go" (X-Out In Club) (5:29)
 "Here I Go" (X-Out Edit) (3:30)
 "Here I Go" (Alex Party Remix) (4:40)
 "Here I Go" (Dub Down Below) (7:26)

Charts

Weekly charts

Year-end charts

References

1994 songs
1995 singles
2 Unlimited songs
English-language Dutch songs
Pete Waterman Entertainment singles
Songs written by Jean-Paul De Coster
Songs written by Phil Wilde
Songs written by Anita Doth
Songs written by Ray Slijngaard
Byte Records singles
ZYX Music singles
Black-and-white music videos
Music videos directed by Nigel Simpkiss